Donald Charles Riddy CBE (10 September 1907 – 20 November 1979) was a British linguist and educationalist. After the Second World War, he was the British Controller-General of the Education Branch, Control Commission for German - British Element, tasked with assisting the de-nazification of Germany through a process of re-education. He was later co-ordinator of the Council of Europe Modern Languages Programme and, for most of his career, Her Majesty's Chief Inspector of Modern Languages in Schools. He was described as a man of ‘wide administrative experience and enormous energy, for whom material difficulties were a challenge which he met with enthusiasm’.

Early life
Riddy was born in Bedford on 10 September 1907, the son of Arthur John Riddy, a baker and corn dealer, and his wife Alice Jane Riddy. He was educated at Bedford Modern School, where he was a member of the cricket team, and St Catharine's College, Cambridge, where he played rugby in the First XV.

Career
Riddy was an assistant master at Felsted School between 1930 and 1940. In 1934, he was responsible for rugby and carried out a revision of the Forties; Second Forty became the Cromwell Club. He left Felsted School to become an inspector of schools.

Riddy was the British Controller-General of the Education Branch, Control Commission for German - British Element, after the Second World War. One of his tasks was to counter twelve years of Nazi indoctrination through a process of re-education. The aim was to eliminate Nazi and militaristic tendencies and to encourage the development of democratic ideas. Notwithstanding the stringency of the aim, Riddy's method and approach was to stress the importance of showing the German people the "benevolent attitude of the occupying power and encouraging a belief in Germany's future".

After his role in Germany, Riddy was made overall co-ordinator of the Council of Europe Modern Languages Programme and, for most of his career, was Her Majesty's Chief Inspector of Modern Languages in Schools. He was Professor of Applied Linguistics at the University of Essex between 1969 and 1970.

Riddy was made CBE in 1946.

Family life
In 1933, Riddy married Constance White in Bedford. He died in Bedford on 20 November 1979 and was survived by his wife, children and grandchildren. He was described as a man of "wide administrative experience and enormous energy, for whom material difficulties were a challenge which he met with enthusiasm".

Selected works
 What Should America Do Now In Bizonia? Reel to reel tape, 1955   
 Recent Developments in Modern Language Teaching. Strasbourg, 1964
 Développements récents dans le domaine de l'enseignement des langues vivantes : 1. Résolutions adoptées par les 2e et 3e Conférences des ministres européens de l'éducation. 2. Compte rendu de trois stages du Conseil de l'Europe, présenté par D. C. Riddy.  Strasbourg, 1964
 Modern Languages And The World Of Today.  Published by AIDELA, Strasbourg, 1967
 Les Langues vivante et le monde moderne. AIDELA, Strasbourg, 1968
 The initial training of teachers of modern foreign languages in colleges and departments of education : report of a survey ; carried out between Jan. 1970 and March 1971 / Part 2, Courses for graduates at colleges and departments of education. 1974
 The Work Of The Council of Europe In The Field of Modern Languages.  Strasbourg, 1972
 The initial training of teachers of modern foreign languages in colleges and departments of education; report of a survey. Colchester, 1974

References

1907 births
1979 deaths
English educational theorists
Linguists from the United Kingdom
Alumni of St Catharine's College, Cambridge
People educated at Bedford Modern School
People from Bedford
20th-century linguists